The Lycian alphabet was used to write the Lycian language of the Asia Minor region of Lycia. It was an extension of the Greek alphabet, with half a dozen additional letters for sounds not found in Greek. It was largely similar to the Lydian and the Phrygian alphabets.

The alphabet

The Lycian alphabet contains letters for 29 sounds. Some sounds are represented by more than one symbol, which is considered one "letter". There are six vowel letters, one for each of the four oral vowels of Lycian, and separate letters for two of the four nasal vowels. Nine of the Lycian letters do not appear to derive from the Greek alphabet.

Numbers 
Lycian uses the following number symbols: I (vertical stroke) = 1, < ("less than" sign) (or, rarely, L or C or V or Y) = 5, O (circle) = 10; a horizontal stroke — is one half; a symbol somewhat like our letter H may mean 100.

The number 128½ would therefore be expressed as HOO<III—.

Unicode

The Lycian alphabet was added to the Unicode Standard in April, 2008 with the release of version 5.1.
It is encoded in Plane 1 (Supplementary Multilingual Plane).

The Unicode block for Lycian is U+10280–U+1029F:

See also

Letoon trilingual
Lycian language

Notes

References
 . Translator Chris Markham.
 
 Roger D. Woodard, 2007, The Ancient Languages of Asia Minor.

External links

 

Writing systems
Obsolete writing systems
Lycian language